Santhosh Prathap is an Indian actor working in the Tamil film industry, his feature film debut was in the lead role Kathai Thiraikathai Vasanam Iyakkam (2014). In 2022, he participated in the popular cooking show Cooku with Comali (season 3) as a contestant in Vijay television.

Career
Santhosh made his acting debut with Kathai Thiraikathai Vasanam Iyakkam (2014) directed by R. Parthiepan. Portraying a struggling director who wants to make a mark in cinema, the film released to positive reviews. After a brief sabbatical, he made his comeback with Dhayam (2017), a thriller which was set completely in a single room. He was first seen in a negative role in Mr. Chandramouli. In 2020, he acted Oh My Kadavule opposite to Vani Bhojan.

Filmography

Television

Web series

References

Indian male film actors
Male actors in Tamil cinema
21st-century Indian male actors
Place of birth missing (living people)
Living people
1987 births